Shvaughn Erin is a fictional character in the 30th and 31st centuries of the , appearing primarily as a supporting character in the various Legion of Super-Heroes series. A native of the planet Earth, she is a member of the Science Police, the law enforcement arm of the United Planets.

Fictional biography

Original continuity
In the 30th century, the Resources Raiders attack Earth just as a diplomatic crisis develops between the United Planets and the Dominion. These dual crises prevent neophyte Science Police officer Shvaughn Erin from informing the Legion of Super-Heroes that one of its enemies has escaped from imprisonment.  Both events are precursors to the so-called "Earthwar", wherein the U.P. is attacked by the Khund Empire and the Dark Circle. The architect behind the conflict is eventually revealed to be the sorcerer Mordru—the escaped foe about whom Shvaughn tried to warn the Legion. She and Karate Kid fend off Khundian troops at Science Police Headquarters, which allows the combined forces of the Legion of Super-Heroes and the Legion of Substitute Heroes to later defeat Mordru, effectively ending the Earthwar.

The following year, Shvaughn is appointed Science Police Liaison Officer to the Legion.  On the first day of her new assignment, she is present when the rogue artificial intelligence Computo possesses a pre-teenaged Danielle Foccart and seizes control of Legion HQ. The crisis is averted when Danielle's older brother Jacques drinks the invisibility serum developed by Lyle Norg, allowing him to attack and immobilize Computo without being detected. Over time, Shvaughn works closely with Legion leader Element Lad. When Shrinking Violet is kidnapped by Imskian terrorists, Shvaughn and Element Lad expose the Durlan actress Yera, who has been duped into impersonating the size-changing Legionnaire. During that time period, Shvaughn and Element Lad begin a romantic relationship, soon falling deeply in love.

"Five Years Later"

Years later, Shvaughn has ended her relationship with Jan Arrah (Element Lad), and Earth's government has fallen under the covert control of the Dominion.  When a Dominion soldier assassinates Earth President Tayla Wellington on live galaxy-wide video broadcast, full-scale war breaks out.  During this period, it is revealed that Shvaughn's biological sex is male, and that for years he—Sean Erin—has been taking a medication known as "Profem" to biologically transform into a female. With open warfare across the planet, he is unable to maintain constant access to Profem. Jan is completely supportive when Sean physically reverts to his original male sex Sean Erin. Ultimately the Dominators are defeated, and Sean is appointed chief of the Science Police contingent on New Earth.

In the wake of the Zero Hour and Infinite Crisis limited series, the events of the "Five Years Later" era of Legion continuity are no longer canonical.

Post-Zero Hour
In Post-Zero Hour continuity, Shvaughn Erin is once again a Science Police officer. In the aftermath of a battle with an Emerald Eye-enthralled Shrinking Violet, Shvaughn is propelled back in time to 20th century Earth, along with Workforce member Inferno and a faction of eight Legionnaires. After many months and several encounters with 20th-century Earth’s superhero community, Shvaughn and the Legionnaires eventually find their way back to their own era.

In this continuity, Shvaughn is a grown adult, while Element Lad is still a teenager. Thus, the pair are not romantically linked. Further, the question of Shvaughn's birth gender is not addressed.

"Threeboot"
Shvaughn does not appear in the continuity featuring the so-called "Threeboot" Legion from Earth-Prime.

Post-Infinite Crisis
The events of the Infinite Crisis miniseries have apparently restored a close analogue of the Pre-Crisis on Infinite Earths Legion to continuity, as seen in "The Lightning Saga" story arc in Justice League of America and Justice Society of America, and in the "Superman and the Legion of Super-Heroes" story arc in Action Comics.  Shvaughn Erin has yet to reappear.

Notes

Characters created by Paul Levitz
Comics characters introduced in 1978
DC Comics characters
DC Comics police officers
Female characters in comics
Fictional transgender women
DC Comics LGBT characters